Kiady Mijoro Razanamahenina (born 15 December 1996) is a Malagasy basketball player.

Career
Born in Longjumeau, France, Razanamahenina played youth basketball with Union Paray Athis Basket. The beginning of his professional career, he played for several teams in the French lower leagues.

In the 2020–21 season, he played with GET Vosges in the Nationale Masculine 1, the French third tier league.

In 2021, Razanamahenina was signed by GNBC to play for the team in the inaugural season of the Basketball Africa League (BAL) in May.

In July 2021, Razanamahenina signed with JSA Bordeaux.

In 2022, he played for Stade Rochelais of the LNB Pro B

National team career
In 2021, Razanamahenina was called up for the Madagascar senior national team for the first time to play in the AfroBasket 2021 qualifiers.

BAL career statistics

|-
| style="text-align:left;"|2021
| style="text-align:left;"|GNBC
| 3 || 2 || 26.9 || .395 || .412 || .667 || 2.0 || 6.0 || 0.7 || .0 || 13.0
|-
|- class="sortbottom"
| style="text-align:center;" colspan="2"|Career
| 3 || 2 || 26.9 || .395 || .412 || .667 || 2.0 || 6.0 || 0.7 || .0 || 13.0

References

External links
Profile at Eurobasket

1996 births
Living people
GNBC basketball players
Malagasy expatriate sportspeople in France
Malagasy men's basketball players
Point guards
GET Vosges players